Difebarbamate (INN) is a tranquilizer of the barbiturate and carbamate families which is used in Europe as a component of a combination drug formulation referred to as tetrabamate (Atrium, Sevrium).

See also 
 Febarbamate

References 

Barbiturates
Carbamates
Sedatives
Muscle relaxants
GABAA receptor positive allosteric modulators